Charles Baker Fowlkes (February 16, 1916 – February 9, 1980) was an American baritone saxophonist who was a member of the Count Basie Orchestra for over twenty-five years.

Early life
Fowlkes was born in New York City on February 16, 1916. He studied alto and tenor saxophone, clarinet, and violin before settling on the baritone saxophone (he occasionally played flute).

Later life and career
Fowlkes spent most of his early career in New York. He played with Tiny Bradshaw (1938–1944), Lionel Hampton (1944–1948), and Arnett Cobb (1948–1951).

Fowlkes joined Basie's orchestra in 1953 and remained with it until his death; the main interruptions during his time with Basie were absences due to managing the career of his wife, vocalist Wini Brown. He died in Dallas on February 9, 1980.

Discography
With The Count Basie Orchestra
The Count! (Clef, 1952 [1955])
Basie Jazz (Clef, 1952 [1954])
Dance Session (Clef, 1953)
Dance Session Album #2 (Clef, 1954)
Basie (Clef, 1954)
Count Basie Swings, Joe Williams Sings (Clef, 1955) with Joe Williams
April in Paris (Verve, 1956)
The Greatest!! Count Basie Plays, Joe Williams Sings Standards with Joe Williams
Metronome All-Stars 1956 (Clef, 1956) with Ella Fitzgerald and Joe Williams
Hall of Fame (Verve, 1956 [1959])
The Greatest!! Count Basie Plays, Joe Williams Sings Standards with Joe Williams (Verve, 1956)
Basie in London (Verve, 1956)
One O'Clock Jump (Verve, 1957) with Joe Williams and Ella Fitzgerald
Count Basie at Newport (Verve, 1957)
The Atomic Mr. Basie (Roulette, 1957) aka Basie and E=MC2
Basie Plays Hefti (Roulette, 1958)
Sing Along with Basie (Roulette, 1958) - with Joe Williams and Lambert, Hendricks & Ross 
Chairman of the Board (Roulette, 1959)
Basie One More Time (Roulette, 1959)
Breakfast Dance and Barbecue (Roulette, 1959)
Basie/Eckstine Incorporated (Roulette, 1959)
Strike Up the Band (Roulette, 1959)
In Person! with Tony Bennett (Verve, 1959)
Everyday I Have the Blues (Roulette, 1959) - with Joe Williams
Dance Along with Basie (Roulette, 1959)
Not Now, I'll Tell You When (Roulette, 1960)
The Count Basie Story (Roulette, 1960)
Kansas City Suite (Roulette, 1960)
Count Basie/Sarah Vaughan with Sarah Vaughan (Roulette, 1960)
Basie at Birdland (Roulette, 1961)
First Time! The Count Meets the Duke with Duke Ellington (Columbia, 1961)
The Legend (Roulette, 1961)
Easin' It (Roulette, 1962)
Back with Basie (Roulette, 1962)
Basie in Sweden (Roulette, 1962)
Sinatra–Basie: An Historic Musical First (Reprise, 1962)
On My Way & Shoutin' Again! (Verve, 1962)
This Time by Basie! (Reprise, 1963)
More Hits of the 50's and 60's (Verve, 1963)
Li'l Ol' Groovemaker...Basie! (Verve, 1963)
Ella and Basie! with Ella Fitzgerald (Verve, 1963)
Basie Land (Verve, 1964)
It Might as Well Be Swing with Frank Sinatra (Reprise, 1964)
Our Shining Hour with Sammy Davis, Jr. (Verve, 1965)
Pop Goes the Basie (Reprise, 1965)
Basie Meets Bond (United Artists, 1966)
Live at the Sands (Before Frank) (Reprise, 1966 [1998])
Sinatra at the Sands (Reprise, 1966) with Frank Sinatra
Basie's Beatle Bag (Verve, 1966)
Broadway Basie's...Way (Command, 1966)
Hollywood...Basie's Way (Command, 1967)
Basie's Beat (Verve, 1967)
Basie's in the Bag (Brunswick, 1967)
The Happiest Millionaire (Coliseum, 1967)
Half a Sixpence (Dot, 1967)
The Board of Directors with the Mills Brothers (Dot, 1967)
Manufacturers of Soul (Brunswick, 1968) with Jackie Wilson
The Board of Directors Annual Report (Dot, 1968) with The Mills Brothers
Basie Straight Ahead (Dot, 1968)
How About This (Paramount, 1968) with Kay Starr
Standing Ovation (Dot, 1969)
Basic Basie (MPS, 1969)
Basie on the Beatles (Happy Tiger, 1969)
Basie Big Band (Pablo, 1975)
I Told You So (Pablo, 1976)
Live in Japan '78 (Pablo, 1978)
Digital III at Montreux with Ella Fitzgerald (Pablo, 1979)
A Classy Pair with Ella Fitzgerald (Pablo, 1979)
With Kenny Clarke
Telefunken Blues (Savoy, 1955)
With Buck Clayton
The Huckle-Buck and Robbins' Nest (Columbia, 1954)
How Hi the Fi (Columbia, 1954)
Jumpin' at the Woodside (Columbia, 1955)
All the Cats Join In (Columbia 1956)
With Stanley Cowell
Regeneration (Strata East, 1976)
With Al Grey 
The Last of the Big Plungers (Argo, 1959)
The Thinking Man’s Trombone (Argo, 1960)
With Coleman Hawkins
The Saxophone Section (World Wide, 1958)
With Milt Jackson
Meet Milt Jackson (Savoy, 1955)
With Yusef Lateef
Part of the Search (Atlantic, 1973)
With Billy Taylor
My Fair Lady Loves Jazz (Impulse!, 1957)
With Eddie "Cleanhead" Vinson
Clean Head's Back in Town (Bethlehem, 1957)
With Frank Wess
Opus de Blues (Savoy, 1959 [1984])

References

1916 births
1980 deaths
African-American musicians
Jazz baritone saxophonists
Musicians from New York City
Count Basie Orchestra members
20th-century American musicians
20th-century saxophonists